Yizheng High School was built in 1942 in Jiangsu Province, People's Republic of China. In 1980, it was named one of the first established high schools in Jiangsu Province. In 1992, it was identified as a qualified high school of Jiangsu Province. In 2004, it became a four-star ordinary high school.

Brief introduction 
Jiangsu Yizheng High School now has 48 classes, 2400 students and 189 school staff (159 full-time teachers) including 4 special-grade teachers, 50 senior teachers and 52 first-grade teachers.

Mission, philosophy, principle 
The school has an educational mission of "being a first-class school of three dimensions and educating a batch of high-qualified Chinese citizens". Its educational philosophy is "people oriented, moral first, legal administration, rule following". Its educational principle is "education is basic, quality is life, teaching is core, scientific is backbone, management is guarantee, a teacher is the key, a leader is serving, development is the absolute principle".

The school is dedicated to modernizing the facilities and to modernizing the teaching system, evaluation system, teaching staff and school management.

References

External links 

Educational institutions established in 1942
Schools in Jiangsu
High schools in Jiangsu
1942 establishments in China